Song of the Wasteland is a 1947 American Western film directed by Thomas Carr and written by J. Benton Cheney. The film stars Jimmy Wakely, Lee White, Dottye Brown, Henry Hall, John James and Mike Ragan. The film was released on May 31, 1947, by Monogram Pictures.

Plot

Cast          
Jimmy Wakely as Jimmy Wakely
Lee White as Doc Henderson
Dottye Brown as Sandra Crane
Henry Hall as Steve Crane
John James as Lance Bennett
Mike Ragan as Tex
Marshall Reed as Drake 
Gary Garrett as Potter
Ted Adams as Luke Forbes
Pierce Lyden as Forrester
George Chesebro as Fred Brooks
Chester Conklin as The Jailer
Johnny Carpenter as Turner
Johnny Bond as Shorty 
Dick Reinhart as Saddle Pals Concertina Player 
Rivers Lewis as Jack

References

External links
 

1947 films
American Western (genre) films
1947 Western (genre) films
Monogram Pictures films
Films directed by Thomas Carr
American black-and-white films
1940s English-language films
1940s American films